William Jacob Steinkemper (December 27, 1913 – November 26, 1973) was an American football tackle who played one season with the Chicago Bears of the National Football League. He played college football at the University of Notre Dame and attended DePaul Academy in Chicago, Illinois.

References

External links
 Just Sports Stats

1913 births
1973 deaths
Players of American football from Ohio
American football tackles
Notre Dame Fighting Irish football players
Chicago Bears players
People from Shelby County, Ohio
People from Franklin Park, Illinois